Andrew James Robert Patrick Martin (March 17, 1975 – March 13, 2009) was a Canadian professional wrestler and actor. He was best known for his time with the World Wrestling Federation/Entertainment (WWF/WWE) under the ring name Test.

During his nine-year tenure with the WWF/WWE, he found his greatest success as a singles performer, winning the Intercontinental and European Championships once each, and the Hardcore Championship twice. Martin found additional success in the tag team division, twice becoming a World Tag Team Champion with Booker T by winning the WWF and WCW World Tag Team Championships once each.

Early life
Martin was born on March 17, 1975, in the Southern Ontario town of Whitby (Durham Region).

Professional wrestling career

Training and early career (1997–1998)
In the mid-1990s, Martin met professional wrestler Bret Hart in a restaurant. After Hart offered to train him to wrestle, Martin spent eight months training under both Hart and Leo Burke. Martin debuted in 1997, wrestling on the Canadian independent circuit under the ring names Martin Kane and T.J. Thunder. Martin continued his training with Dory Funk Jr. at Funk's Funkin' Dojo, a training center in Ocala, Florida.

World Wrestling Federation/Entertainment (1998–2004)

The Corporation (1998–1999)

Martin debuted in the World Wrestling Federation on the October 25, 1998, episode of Sunday Night Heat as an unnamed bodyguard for the band Mötley Crüe, who were performing on the show. In a scripted event, Martin threw an overzealous fan off the stage during the band's rehearsal. On the December 14, 1998, episode of Raw is War, Martin aligned himself with WWF Champion The Rock by attacking The Rock's rival Triple H. A week later on the December 21 episode of Raw, Martin made his in ring debut teaming with The Rock to defeat Triple H and X-Pac by disqualification. Martin went on to join The Corporation, a wrestling stable consisting of numerous other wrestlers. During this time, he received the ring name "Test", since he usually checked the mic saying "test...test..."

On the January 11, 1999, episode of Raw is War, Test competed in a Corporation vs. D-X Corporate Rumble, which was won by Chyna, making her the 30th entrant in the upcoming Royal Rumble. At the Royal Rumble, Test competed in the Royal Rumble match but was eliminated by Steve Austin. On the March 8 episode of Raw, Test defeated X-Pac. At WrestleMania XV on March 28, Test teamed with D'Lo Brown in a WWF Tag Team Championship title match against Jeff Jarrett and Owen Hart where Jarrett and Hart retained their titles. Along with Triple H, he helped Shane McMahon retain the European Championship against X-Pac at WrestleMania XV. After being removed from the Corporation, Martin joined The Union who were known to carry 2x4 boards of wood with them. The group briefly feuded with the Corporation and at Over the Edge, The Union defeated The Corporate Ministry in an Eight-man elimination tag team match, before quietly disbanding.

Relationship with Stephanie McMahon and T & A (1999–2000)

Martin then began an on-screen relationship with Stephanie McMahon that would lead to a "Love her or Leave her" match at SummerSlam. He went on to defeat Shane McMahon at SummerSlam in 1999, gaining Shane's blessing, which led to an on-screen engagement between Stephanie and Martin. Later in the storyline, The British Bulldog hit Stephanie with a trash can, which caused her to develop amnesia. Plans for the wedding continued however, and on the night of the wedding Test defeated Triple H with a quick 3-count from a referee in a Vince McMahon mask. Triple H later showed a video which revealed that he had drugged Stephanie and had taken her to Las Vegas, Nevada, where he married her in a drive-through ceremony. Stephanie then turned on Test and aligned herself with Triple H, ushering in the McMahon-Helmsley Era. Test then had a short feud with DX. On the December 6 episode of Raw, Test and Kane were defeated by Triple H and X-Pac. DX would go on to break his nose and force him into matches like a handicap match against Big Boss Man and Albert. On the December 12 episode of Heat, Test faced Al Snow in a losing effort. The next night on Raw is War, Test teamed with Triple H to face The New Age Outlaws resulting in Triple H turning on and assaulting him. The next week on Raw is War, Triple H would continue to torment him by putting him in a handicap match against The New Age Outlaws, calling it a "Christmas present". On the January 17 episode of Raw is War, Test defeated The Big Boss Man to win the WWF Hardcore Championship. At the Royal Rumble, Test competed in the Royal Rumble match where he was eliminated by The Big Show. Test then lost the WWF Hardcore Championship to Crash Holly on the February 24 episode of SmackDown!. Test then turned heel and formed a tag team with Albert. The two were known as T & A (Test and Albert) and were managed by Trish Stratus. At WrestleMania 2000 they defeated Al Snow and Steve Blackman. Then at Backlash, T & A (with Trish Stratus) defeated The Dudley Boyz. At King of the Ring, T & A were defeated in a Four corners elimination match for the WWF Tag Team Championship by Edge and Christian. At Fully Loaded, T & A and Trish Stratus lost to The Hardy Boyz and Lita in a Six-person mixed tag team match. At Unforgiven, Test competed in a Hardcore Open Invitational for the WWF Hardcore Championship which was won by Steve Blackman. At No Mercy, T & A and Trish Stratus competed against The Acolytes Protection Agency (Bradshaw and Faarooq) and Lita, which ended in a no contest because of T & A attacking The APA before the match. At Survivor Series, T & A and Trish Stratus faced Steve Blackman, Crash Holly and Molly Holly in a losing effort.

The Invasion and various feuds (2000–2002)

On December 28, 2000, Albert attacked Test at the orders of Stephanie McMahon-Helmsley, effectively disbanding T & A and turning Test face again.

Again a singles wrestler, Test eliminated William Regal during the 2001 Royal Rumble match and subsequently defeated him the next night on Raw is War to win the WWF European Championship. Test then feuded with Eddie Guerrero, losing the European Championship to him at WrestleMania X-Seven following interference from Dean Malenko and Perry Saturn. On the April 30 episode of Raw is War, Test defeated Triple H by disqualification after Triple H hit him with a chair and powerbombed him through the announce table. At Judgment Day, Test competed in a Triple threat hardcore match for the WWF Hardcore Championship which was won by Rhyno. On the June 14 episode of SmackDown!, Test defeated Rhyno to win the Hardcore Championship but he would lose the title back to Rhyno on the June 25 episode of Raw is War.

During the Invasion storyline, Bradshaw and Faarooq were suspicious of Test's friendship with Shane McMahon, prior to Shane's heel turn and the formation of the ECW half of The Alliance. They decided to attack Test because they thought he was the mole within the WWF, only to find out he wasn't. In retaliation, on the August 9, 2001, episode of SmackDown!, Test turned heel once again by joining The Alliance by helping Alliance members Diamond Dallas Page and Chris Kanyon defeat the APA for the WWF Tag Team Championship. Teaming with The Dudley Boyz, Test went on to pin Bradshaw at SummerSlam to defeat the APA and Spike Dudley in a six-man tag team match. The next day on Raw is War, Stephanie approached Test with the task of beating Chris Jericho after Rhyno failed to do so at SummerSlam. Despite past conflicts, they shook hands, thus finally resolving the grudge between himself and Stephanie. After Test won the match against Jericho he would defeat Kane at No Mercy. He then began teaming with Booker T regularly in September 2001. Together they defeated The Brothers of Destruction on the September 27 episode of SmackDown! to win the WCW Tag Team Championship. However they would go on to lose the titles to The Hardy Boyz on the October 8 episode of Raw. On the November 1 episode of SmackDown!, Test and Booker T defeated The Rock and Chris Jericho to win the WWF Tag Team Championship, which they would go on to also lose to The Hardy Boyz eleven days later on Raw.

Following this, Test returned to singles competition and began feuding with Edge. After defeating Edge to win the WWF Intercontinental Championship, Test lost the title back to him in a unification match at Survivor Series for the WCW United States Championship and the WWF Intercontinental Championship. On the same night, he won a battle royal which granted him on-screen immunity from being fired for a year after attacking and taking the place of Scotty 2 Hotty. For the next few weeks, a storyline was built around Test using that immunity to justify attacking fellow wrestlers but the storyline went nowhere and shortly after the year turned it was dropped. At Vengeance, Test and Christian were defeated by Scotty 2 Hotty and Albert. At the 2002 Royal Rumble, Test competed in the Royal Rumble match, but was eliminated by Stone Cold Steve Austin. At No Way Out, Test and Booker T faced Tazz and Spike Dudley for the WWF Tag Team Championship but failed to win the titles. At WrestleMania X8, Test, Mr. Perfect and Lance Storm lost to Rikishi, Scotty 2 Hotty and Albert in six-man tag team match on Sunday Night Heat.

At the 2002 WWF draft lottery, Test was drafted to the SmackDown! brand. On the May 2 episode of SmackDown!, Test and Christian defeated Mark Henry and Faarooq. On the May 9 episode of SmackDown!, Test defeated Mark Henry. On the May 23 episode of SmackDown!, Test defeated Randy Orton. On the May 30 episode of SmackDown!, Test defeated Triple H. On the June 13 episode of SmackDown!, Test defeated The Hurricane in a King of the Ring qualifier. The next week, Test defeated Hardcore Holly in a Quarterfinals match but would go on to lose in the semi-finals of the King of the Ring tournament to the eventual winner, Brock Lesnar. On the July 4 episode of SmackDown!, Test, Christian and Lance Storm formed The Un-Americans. On the July 25 episode of SmackDown!, John Cena poked fun at him so he slapped him which led to a match where Cena won. On the July 29 episode of Raw, The Un-Americans left SmackDown! and joined the Raw brand. Later that night they attacked The Undertaker.

The storyline culminated in a match at SummerSlam where Undertaker defeated Test. The Un-Americans lost to the team of Kane, Goldust, Booker T and Bubba Ray Dudley at Unforgiven and after a series of losses The Un-Americans divided, and the stable split in brawling fashion and disbanded in September 2002.

Relationship with Stacy Keibler and departure (2002–2004)

In October 2002, after the Un-Americans dissolved, Test received Stacy Keibler as his on-screen girlfriend and "image consultant". This began by Keibler telling Test he should embrace his fanbase and call them his "Testicles", in line with The Rock's fan group, the "People", Kane's "Kaneanites", Chris Jericho's "Jerichoholics" and Hulk Hogan's "Hulkamaniacs". This eventually culminated with Test cutting off his long hair and trading his trademark leather pants for normal wrestling trunks. The couple were originally heels, but due to the popularity of the gimmick, quickly became faces. At the 2003 Royal Rumble, Test competed in the Royal Rumble match, but was eliminated by Batista. In May, Test formed a tag team with the returning Scott Steiner, at the request of Keibler, and at Judgment Day, they faced La Résistance in a losing effort. Later in the night, he went on to compete in a battle royal for the vacant WWE Intercontinental Championship, but it was eventually won by Christian. Test and Keibler eventually split up due to the ongoing mistreatment of Keibler at the hands of Test, while turning him heel again and developed a misogynist streak. At Bad Blood, Steiner defeated Test for Keibler's managerial services. On the August 18 episode of Raw, Test defeated Steiner, winning the services of Keibler and announcing his intentions to "make her a whore". At Unforgiven, Test again defeated Steiner, forcing him to become his manservant. Steiner then attacked Keibler, blaming her for the loss and for him having to take orders from another man. Test then freed Steiner from his obligation, and the pair became a tag team once again, as now both treated Keibler like a slave. The two challenged for the World Tag Team Championship on multiple occasions but came up short each time. The pair were then fired by Mick Foley (therefore freeing Keibler from their control), who was the on-screen Co-General Manager for two nights, thus finally ending the year-long angle. They were then re-hired by Eric Bischoff, upon his return to the position of Raw General Manager. At Armageddon, Test and Scott Steiner competed in a Tag Team Turmoil match for the World Tag Team Championship but failed to win the titles.

Test then had a short feud with Steven Richards in January 2004, which started after Test kicked Victoria (Richard's on-screen girlfriend) in the jaw. They fought several times on Sunday Night Heat, with Richards winning every match. On the January 19 episode of Raw, Test competed in a Triple Threat Royal Rumble Qualifying Match against Goldberg and Steiner. After Goldberg won the match Test and Steiner would officially disband. At the Royal Rumble, Test was found knocked out backstage by some officials and the Raw Sheriff Stone Cold Steve Austin when it was his turn to enter. Austin ordered someone to quickly replace Test as the 21st rumble entrant. The person who attacked him and replaced him was revealed to be Mick Foley. Test would gain some revenge on the February 2 episode of Raw, when he and Randy Orton attacked Foley in a backstage area. Test would start competing against the likes of Rico and Stevie Richards regularly on Heat. On the March 1 episode of Raw, Test and Matt Hardy were defeated by Rob Van Dam and Booker T. Test would go on to compete on house shows until he reaggravated the neck injury that had kept him out of action the past few months.

Martin had spinal fusion surgery performed by Dr. Lloyd Youngblood in July 2004. On November 1, 2004, it was announced that he was released from his WWE contract along with A-Train and Billy Gunn.

Independent circuit, Italy, and Australia (2005-2006)
Test returned to the ring in May 2005, and began accepting bookings with various independent promotions. On August 27, 2005, Test wrestled at WrestleReunion 2 teaming with The Masked Superstar, Steve Corino, and The Original Evil Clown losing to D'Lo Brown, The Blue Meanie, Tom Prichard and Dusty Rhodes in Philadelphia. One of his most notable victories during this tenure was against former TNA wrestler Samoa Joe for World Series Wrestling in Australia. His most prominent role in the independent circuit was in the Nu-Wrestling Evolution promotion in Italy, where he took on the ring name "Big Foot", due to his "big boot" finishing move. He also feuded with Mark Jindrak in January 2006 in Italy.

Return to WWE (2006–2007)

On March 22, 2006, WWE.com announced that Test had verbally agreed to return to WWE. Subsequently, vignettes began to play during ECW on Sci Fi, announcing that Test was debuting on the ECW brand. He officially made his return on the July 4 episode of ECW, defeating Al Snow. In late-July, Test aligned with the fellow ECW newcomers, Mike Knox, Big Show, and Matt Striker to feud with the "ECW Originals", which consisted of Rob Van Dam, Sabu, and The Sandman. On the August 1 episode of ECW, Test and Mike Knox defeated Sandman and Tommy Dreamer in an Extreme Rules match, with Test pinning Dreamer. On the September 5 episode of ECW, Test and Mike Knox lost to Rob Van Dam and Sabu in an Extreme Rules Match. On the October 3 episode of ECW, Test defeated Rob Van Dam in an Extreme Rules Match.

On the November 7 episode of ECW, Test defeated Tommy Dreamer to earn a spot in the Extreme Elimination Chamber at December to Dismember. Test was a member of Team Big Show (Big Show, Test, Montel Vontavious Porter, Finlay and Umaga) facing Team Cena (John Cena, Kane, Bobby Lashley, Sabu and Rob Van Dam) at Survivor Series. During the match, Test eliminated Rob Van Dam but was eventually eliminated by Sabu. Team Big Show eventually lost. At December to Dismember, he eliminated Hardcore Holly and Rob Van Dam in the Extreme Elimination Chamber match for the ECW World Championship, before being pinned by the eventual winner Bobby Lashley. On the January 16, 2007, episode of ECW, Test competed in a triple threat match for the ECW World Championship, which was won by Bobby Lashley. The following week, Test faced Lashley for the ECW World Championship but failed to win the title. He would fail to defeat Lashley for the title on two further occasions, at the 2007 Royal Rumble and on the January 30 episode of ECW.

Following these defeats, Test would disappear from WWE television. On February 18, WWE commentator Jim Ross, confirmed on his blog that Test had been suspended for 30 days for violating the WWE "Wellness Program". A week after Ross made the announcement, it was reported that Test was officially released from his WWE contract. Martin released a statement through his MySpace saying that the release was mutual and he had requested it.

Total Nonstop Action Wrestling (2007)
After his departure, Martin debuted in Total Nonstop Action Wrestling as a face under his real name on the August 2, 2007 episode of TNA Impact!. He allied himself with Abyss and Sting and helped them defeat A.J. Styles and Christian Cage in a tag team ladder match. At Hard Justice, Martin wrestled his first and only match for TNA as "The Punisher" Andrew Martin, as he teamed with Sting and Abyss to defeat Christian's Coalition (Cage, Tomko, and A.J. Styles) in a Doomsday Chamber of Blood match, after Styles was slammed into a pile of broken glass and pinned by Abyss.

Late career (2007–2009)
On December 19, 2007, Martin announced that he would embark on a final tour of Britain, Ireland and France in February and March 2008 before retiring from professional wrestling. Martin finished his retirement tour in France, losing to Rene Dupree in a series of matches. However, Martin did wrestle two more matches in Japan in 2009. Martin defeated Lance Hoyt February 1 and Mitsuya Nagai on February 3.

Personal life
Martin dated WWE Diva Stacy Keibler from 2001 until 2005. He also dated another WWE Diva, Kelly Kelly, from 2007 until just before his death in March 2009.

On September 14, 2007, and April 5, 2008, Martin was arrested for driving under the influence in Hillsborough County and Pasco County, Florida. He was booked into jail both times, but was released the following day after posting bail.

Death
Martin was found dead in his Tampa, Florida apartment on March 13, 2009, four days prior to what would have been his 34th birthday. Police were contacted after a neighbor reportedly realized Martin had been laying motionless on his couch for some time, seeing him through a window outside Martin's apartment, prompting them to call 911. Authorities retrieved Martin's body after scaling his balcony and confirming that he was indeed dead. Toxicology reports revealed that Martin's death was caused by an accidental overdose of the prescription pain medication oxycodone. It was reported that in August 2008, Martin entered a drug and alcohol rehabilitation center in West Palm Beach, Florida after reaching out to WWE, his former employer, for help regarding his substance abuse troubles.  Martin's body was cremated and his remains were flown to his family in his hometown of Whitby, Ontario.

It was later determined by forensic pathologist Dr. Bennet Omalu that Martin had severe chronic traumatic encephalopathy (CTE), a brain condition caused by repeated concussions and subconcussive head injuries that can cause severe headaches, mood swings, depression, and/or aggressive behavior. Fellow Canadian wrestler and one of Martin's idols, Chris Benoit, also suffered from CTE before his death in June 2007, and it was determined to be a factor in the Chris Benoit double-murder and suicide.

Filmography

Championships and accomplishments
Pro Wrestling Illustrated
Ranked No. 37 of the 500 top singles wrestlers in the PWI 500 in 2001
Wild West Wrestling
WWW Heavyweight Championship (1 time)
World Wrestling Federation/World Wrestling Entertainment
WCW Tag Team Championship (1 time) – with Booker T
WWF European Championship (1 time)
WWF Hardcore Championship (2 times)
WWF Intercontinental Championship (1 time)
WWF Tag Team Championship (1 time) – with Booker T

See also

 List of premature professional wrestling deaths

References

External links

1975 births
2009 deaths
20th-century professional wrestlers
21st-century professional wrestlers
American male professional wrestlers
Canadian male professional wrestlers
Canadian strength athletes
Drug-related deaths in Florida
Professional wrestlers from Ontario
Professional wrestlers with chronic traumatic encephalopathy
Sportspeople from Whitby, Ontario
WWF European Champions
WWF/WWE Hardcore Champions
WWF/WWE Intercontinental Champions
WCW World Tag Team Champions